The Logan County Courthouse in Guthrie, Oklahoma, at 301 E. Harrison Street, was built in 1907.  It was listed on the National Register of Historic Places in 1984.

Designed by architect P. H. Weathers, it is a four-story buff brick building with "simplified Beaux Arts" as well as Classical Revival styling.

It is also a contributing building in the National Register-listed Guthrie Historic District.

References

External links

Courthouses in Oklahoma
National Register of Historic Places in Logan County, Oklahoma
Neoclassical architecture in Oklahoma
Government buildings completed in 1907